The Karachi Kings (often abbreviated as KK) is a franchise cricket team which competes in Pakistan Super League (PSL). The team is based in Karachi, the provincial capital of Sindh, Pakistan. The team was coached by Peter Moores, and captained by Babar Azam. Wasim Akram is the president of Karachi Kings.

Administration and coaching staff

Squad 
 Players with international caps are listed in bold.
 Ages are given as of the first match of the season, 27 January 2022.

Season standings

Points table

League matches

References

External Links 
 Team Records in 2022 at ESPNcricinfo

2022 in Sindh
2022 Pakistan Super League
Kings in 2022
2022